Sir John Henry Hayes  (born 23 June 1958) is a Conservative Party politician in the United Kingdom. He has held five ministerial positions and six shadow ministerial positions. Hayes was appointed as a Privy Councillor in April 2013, and a Knight Bachelor in November 2018.

Hayes is considered a social conservative, economic protectionist, communitarian and Eurosceptic. He strongly supported Britain's withdrawal from the EU and has spoken regularly about his belief in conservative ideas and philosophy. Hayes is known for speaking passionately and theatrically in the House of Commons chamber and has been described as a "colourful character" who is "popular and influential on the Tory right".

First elected in 1997, Hayes is the Member of Parliament (MP) for the Lincolnshire constituency of South Holland and The Deepings - the safest Conservative seat in the United Kingdom. South Holland delivered the nation's second-highest Leave vote in the 2016 referendum on the United Kingdom's membership of the European Union. 73.6% of voters voted for withdrawal from the EU, second only to neighbouring Boston.

Early life and career
Hayes was born into a working-class family in Woolwich and grew up on a council estate. He was educated at the Colfe's Grammar School (Lewisham) and at the University of Nottingham from where he graduated with a BA degree in politics and a PGCE in history and English. Hayes was involved in a campaign to create a pipe-smoking society affiliated to the Students' Union. He also chaired the University's Conservative Association from 1981 to 1982 while being President of one of the residential halls, Lincoln's Junior Common Room, and served as treasurer of the University's Students' Union from 1982 to 1983.

Hayes suffered a serious head injury in his early 20s, from which he has never fully recovered. He has focused much of his career on raising funds for research into acquired brain injury and support for those who suffer from it.

Before entering Parliament, he was a sales director for The Data Base Ltd, an information technology company based in Nottingham.

He was elected to Nottinghamshire County Council in 1985 where he was the Conservative Group Spokesman on Education and Chairman of its Campaigns Committee. He served there for 13 years, standing down following his election to parliament. He contested Derbyshire North East at the 1987 general election but was defeated by Labour's Harry Barnes by 3,720 votes. He fought the same seat at the 1992 general election and although he increased the Tory vote, finished some 6,270 votes behind Barnes.

Parliamentary career

Early years (1997–2010)
Hayes was elected to the House of Commons for the newly created seat of South Holland and The Deepings in Lincolnshire at the 1997 general election. He secured a majority of 7,991 and has been elected with increased majorities at successive elections since, with swings to him of 4.4% in 2001, 4.3% in 2005 and 0.3% in 2010, increasing the Conservative share of the vote to 59.1%. It is now a safe seat for the Tories. He made his maiden speech on 2 July 1997.

In Parliament, Hayes served on the Agriculture, Fisheries and Food Select committee for two years from 1997 and spent two years from 1998 on the education and employment committee. In 1999, he was appointed by William Hague as a vice chairman of the Conservative Party with responsibility for campaigning, and in 2000 continued on the front-bench as Shadow Schools Minister in the Department for Education and Skills. He was appointed Assistant Chief Whip Opposition Whip by Iain Duncan Smith — for whom Hayes had been a speech writer — in 2001, before entering his shadow cabinet as the shadow Agriculture & Fisheries Secretary in 2002.

In 2003, after Michael Howard became Conservative leader,  Hayes was appointed as Shadow Minister for Housing & Planning. He was briefly a spokesman on transport following the 2005 general election before being moved by David Cameron later in 2005 to speak on education and skills and in particular on vocational education. He was promoted by Cameron to Shadow Minister for Lifelong Learning, Further and Higher Education in 2007.

Since 2010
On 13 May 2010, Hayes was appointed as Minister of State for Further Education, Skills and Lifelong Learning jointly at the Department for Business, Innovation and Skills and the Department for Education. On 4 September 2012 he was appointed Minister of State for Energy at the Department for Energy and Climate Change. On 28 March 2013, he was removed from the DECC and replaced by Michael Fallon. Hayes became Minister without Portfolio in the Cabinet Office. He was appointed to the Privy Council on 9 April 2013.

Hayes was appointed as Minister of State at the Department for Transport in the reshuffle on 15 July 2014 with responsibility for national roads, Highways Agency reform and the Infrastructure Bill, and maritime issues. He was also the Commons spokesman on bus policy.

After the 2015 general election, Hayes was moved to the Home Office, being appointed "Minister of State, Minister for Security", with responsibility for counter-terrorism, security, serious organised crime and cyber crime, amongst other issues.

In the government formed by Theresa May in July 2016, Hayes was reshuffled back to become a Minister at the Department for Transport. He resigned from his post as Minister of State for Transport on 9 January 2018 during a cabinet reshuffle and was replaced by Jo Johnson.

In July 2022, he said of precautions for a predicted 40° heatwave:

Political positions

Abortion 
Hayes is resolutely opposed to abortion, in all circumstances.

Brexit 
Hayes described Britain's withdrawal from the EU as something "I've believed in for my whole life". He stated that voting Leave would provide an opportunity to "finally bring down the curtain on the Blair era". Following the referendum, Hayes criticised the "stunned hysteria" of an "establishment elite" who had "never before failed to get their own way".

Capital punishment 
Hayes is reported as having asked the UK Government to consider bringing back the death penalty: referencing Westminster Bridge attacker Khalid Masood, Hayes stated that: "If he had survived I think most of the British public would have been OK if he had received a fair trial and been put to death - most people would deem that appropriate.". Additionally, Hayes states that, for murder, "I say capital punishment should be a sentence available to the courts but the death penalty should not be mandatory - that's always been my position."

Constitutional monarchy 
Hayes is a strong supporter of constitutional monarchy, but has voiced his opinion that the monarchy must resist the "culture of celebrity".

Common Sense Group 
Hayes is the chair of the Common Sense Group, an informal group of conservative politicians and journalists who advocate for the future direction of the Conservative Party and the UK.

Following an interim report on the connections between colonialism and properties now in the care of the National Trust, including links with historic slavery, Hayes was among the signatories of a letter to The Telegraph in November 2020 from the group. The letter accused the National Trust of being "coloured by cultural Marxist dogma, colloquially known as the 'woke agenda'".

Economics 
Hayes is a protectionist, rejecting "globalist free trade" and stating his belief that government should "redistribute advantage". He supports tariffs designed to protect "British jobs and British workers". Hayes has criticised the "gig economy" and believes that only "meaningful careers that contribute to societal good" can restore economic opportunities within the local communities they exist to serve. He has been a vocal critic of supermarkets, condemning their exploitation of farmers and suppliers and stating his belief that "supermarkets have decimated high streets, destroyed livelihoods and distorted the food chain".

Hayes is a vocal proponent of small and medium-sized businesses and has reiterated his belief that "cooperatives, mutuals and guilds that can reshape and reform our economic system". He warned that the Conservative Party "must not allow itself to sleepwalk towards becoming a mouthpiece for globalist corporate business".

Energy policy 
Following his appointment as Energy Minister 28 March 2013 Hayes vowed to put "coal back into the coalition". During his tenure, subsidies for renewables were cut, planning rules for onshore wind were tightened, and a zero-carbon homes policy was scrapped. According to research, if his policies had not been enacted, "...energy bills would have been £9.5bn lower under the October price cap and £13bn lower in January" during the 2021–2022 global energy crisis. Hayes supported the lifting of the ban on Fracking in the UK stating "Fracking had 'insulated' America and suggested it could do the same for Britain if carried out safely." Since 2018 Hayes has received payments of £50,000 per year working for a Lebanese based oil company BB Energy as a strategic adviser which has drawn criticism from Transparency International UK “MPs are elected to provide a voice for their constituents in Westminster, but when they also have lucrative side-jobs for private companies it raises questions over whose interests they are really serving,” said Alex Runswick, senior advocacy manager at Transparency International UK.

Foreign policy 
Hayes has consistently voted in favour of military interventions in Afghanistan, Iraq and Syria.

Safe standing 
Hayes is in favour of safe standing at football stadiums.

LGBT issues

Section 28 
In 2003, Hayes voted against the repeal of Section 28.

Civil partnerships and Equal marriage 
Hayes has consistently voted against same-sex marriage and civil partnerships. In line with his socially conservative views, he asserts marriage to be solely the lifetime union of one man and one woman.

Sex and gender 
Hayes has argued the Government should respond with "compassion" to those who "feel compelled to identify as the opposite sex" but opposed proposals to allow individuals to change their natural gender without medical consultation. He criticised "radical LGBT groups" and stated his belief that "we must reaffirm that gender has no meaning if divorced from biological facts". In an article written in a local paper, Hayes argued "we should celebrate the God-given differences between men and women, enjoying the special characteristics of two naturally-ordained human types".

Hayes spoke in favour of language that would block a future transgender or non-binary minister to take maternity leave in the debate on the Ministerial and other Maternity Allowances Act 2021, comparing inclusive language to George Orwell's Nineteen Eighty-Four.

Wind turbines 
During his time as Energy Minister, Hayes clashed with Liberal Democrat coalition partners when he declared that there should be no further construction of onshore wind turbines, declaring "enough is enough".

Affiliations
Hayes is a member of the Countryside Alliance and of the Society for the Protection of Unborn Children (SPUC). He has served as the chairman of the All Party Group on disability and secretary of the All Party Group on brain injury. Since 2009, he has been Honorary Chairman of the British Caribbean Association.

In addition to his seat in Parliament, he holds three outside jobs which reportedly pay him £118,000 per year. The most lucrative of them is the role of strategic adviser to BB Energy, a Dubai-headquartered energy trading group.

Personal life
Hayes married Susan Hopewell in 1997; they have two sons.

Honours
Hayes was sworn as a member of the Privy Council on 15 May 2013 at Buckingham Palace.

Hayes was appointed Commander of the Order of the British Empire (CBE) in the 2016 Prime Minister's Resignation Honours for political and public service.

He was appointed a Knight Bachelor in November 2018. This was an honour that was widely reported as bringing the awards system into disrepute; the supposition being that he had been offered and accepted the award in return for support for (or lack of opposition to) the Prime Minister's Brexit Draft Withdrawal Agreement. However, he subsequently announced his intention to vote against the proposed withdrawal agreement anyway.

References

External links
 
 Profile at Westminster Parliamentary Record

1958 births
Living people
Alumni of the University of Nottingham
Knights Bachelor
Commanders of the Order of the British Empire
Conservative Party (UK) MPs for English constituencies
Members of the Privy Council of the United Kingdom
People educated at Colfe's School
People from South Holland (district)
UK MPs 1997–2001
UK MPs 2001–2005
UK MPs 2005–2010
UK MPs 2010–2015
UK MPs 2015–2017
UK MPs 2017–2019
UK MPs 2019–present
Politicians awarded knighthoods